Drew Kibler (born March 9, 2000) is an American competition swimmer specializing in freestyle events. He is a world record holder in the short course 4×200 meter freestyle relay and an American record holder in the 4×200 yard freestyle relay. He won a gold medal in the 4×200 meter freestyle relay each at the 2022 World Aquatics Championships (long course) and the 2022 World Short Course Championships and placed fourth in the event at the 2020 Summer Olympics. In the 200 meter freestyle, he took fourth-place at both the 2022 World Aquatics Championships and the 2022 World Short Course Championships. He is also a three-time NCAA champion in the 4×200 yard freestyle relay, winning NCAA titles in the event in 2019, 2021, and 2022.

Background
Kibler was born with a hearing impairment, wears hearing aids outside the pool but not in the water, and works through difficulties hearing whistles signaling to competitors a race is about to start at swimming competitions.

Career

2016–2018
In August 2016, at the Junior Pan Pacific Swimming Championships for the year, Kibler won a gold medal in the 4×100 meter freestyle relay, a silver medal in the 4×200 meter freestyle relay, the bronze medal in the 200 meter freestyle, won the b-final of the 50 meter freestyle, placed second in the b-final of the 100 meter freestyle, and placed nineteenth in the 400 meter freestyle.

As part of the 4×200 meter freestyle relay at the 2017 FINA World Junior Swimming Championships, held in Indianapolis in August, Kibler won a silver medal, swimming the anchor leg of the relay in the preliminaries in a time of 1:48.43. He also initially won a gold medal as part of the 4×100 meter medley relay, swimming backstroke in the final, however the medal was later disqualified due to an anti-doping rule violation by one of his fellow relay teammates. In his non-medaling events, he placed fourth in the 100 meter backstroke with a time of 54.97 seconds, fifteenth in the 100 meter butterfly with a 53.80, and helped achieve a fourth-place finish in the 4×100 meter freestyle relay, splitting a 50.04 for the third leg of the relay in the final after swimming on the prelims relay as well.

The following year, at the 2018 Junior Pan Pacific Swimming Championships, held in August in Suva, Fiji, he won the 200 meter freestyle with a Championships record time of 1:47.65 as well as winning gold medals in the 100 meter freestyle, 4×100 meter freestyle relay, 4×200 meter freestyle relay, and 4×100 meter medley relay, a silver medal in the 50 meter freestyle, and placing second in the b-final of the 100 meter butterfly.

2019

2019 NCAA Championships
At the 2019 NCAA Championships in Austin, Texas in March, Kibler set new NCAA, American, and US Open records with relay teammates Austin Katz, Jeff Newkirk, and Townley Haas in the 4×200 yard freestyle relay in a time of 6:05.08, leading-off the relay on the first 200-yard stretch with a 1:32.06. He also won the bronze medal in the 200 yard freestyle with a time of 1:31.76, placed ninth in the 50 yard freestyle with a b-final-winning time of 19.15 seconds, and placed sixteenth overall in the 100 yard freestyle with a time of 42.63 seconds in the b-final.

2019 Pan American Games

At the 2019 Pan American Games in Lima, Peru, Kibler won three medals. In the 4×100 meter freestyle relay on August 6, Kibler won the silver medal with his relay teammates Michael Chadwick, Grant House, and Nathan Adrian with a final time of 3:14.94. On August 7, Kibler finished third in the final of the 200 meter freestyle with a time of 1:47.71 and won the bronze medal in the event. Two days later on August 9, Kibler won his third medal, a second silver medal, in the 4×200 meter freestyle relay with relay teammates Grant House, Christopher Wieser, and Samuel Pomajevich who together swam a final relay time of 7:14.82.

2021

2021 NCAA Championships

At the 2021 NCAA Championships in Greensboro, North Carolina, Kibler swam a 41.45 in the prelims heats of the 100 yard freestyle, advancing to the final ranking second. In the final of the 100 yard freestyle, he tied for second-place. Later in the same finals session, he anchored the 4×100 yard freestyle relay to a fourth-place finish in 2:48.28, splitting a 41.63. One day earlier, he placed second in the final of the 200 yard freestyle with a personal best time of 1:30.39, finishing less than three-tenths of a second behind first-place finisher Kieran Smith. The day before that, he achieved a fifth-place finish in the 500 yard freestyle. One day earlier, and the first day of competition, he helped win the 4×200 yard freestyle relay in 6:07.25, leading-off the relay with a 1:30.65 on the opening leg.

2020 US Olympic Trials
Kibler qualified for the 2020 Olympic Games in the 4x200 meter freestyle relay by placing third in the 200 meter freestyle final with a time of 1:45.92 at the 2020 US Olympic Trials in Omaha, Nebraska. In the prelims heats of the 100 meter freestyle, he swam a 48.72 to qualify for the semifinals ranking tenth. For the semifinals, he swam a 49.02, placing 14th and not qualifying for the final. In his third event, the 100 meter butterfly, he placed 23rd in the prelims heats with a time of 53.10 seconds. On the final day of competition, he decided not to swim the 50 meter freestyle.

2020 Summer Olympics

In the prelims heats of the 4×200 meter freestyle relay at the 2020 Summer Olympics in Tokyo, Japan, Kibler swam with relay teammates Patrick Callan, Blake Pieroni, and Andrew Seliskar to finish fifth overall and advance the relay to the final. Following his performance in the prelims, he was selected to swim on the relay in the final along with Zach Apple, Kieran Smith, and Townley Haas, which made him the only relay member to swim in both the prelims and final of the event. In the final of the event, Kibler helped the relay finish fourth overall. With his competition at the 2020 Olympic Games, he became the first Olympic swimmer representing the United States from Carmel, Indiana.

2022
Heading into championships season his senior year competing collegiately for the Texas Longhorns, Kibler won the 200 yard freestyle in a new pool record time of 1:32.74 at the Robson and Lindley Aquatics Center and Barr-McMillion Natatorium in a dual meet against Southern Methodist University.

2022 Big 12 Championships
At the 2022 Big 12 Conference Championships in February 2022, Kibler led-off the 4×200 yard freestyle relay with a 1:32.20, helping win the event with a final time of 6:08.76 that set a new Championships record. For the 50 yard freestyle prelims heats on day two, he swam a time of 19.33 seconds to qualify for the evening final ranked third. He placed third in the final with a time of 19.48 seconds, finishing 0.31 seconds after the first-place finisher. On the third day, Kibler ranked first in the prelims heats of the 200 yard freestyle, swimming a time of 1:32.88. He won the final with a 1:32.64, finishing 0.28 seconds ahead of the second-place finisher. He also led-off the 4×50 yard freestyle relay in 19.42 seconds later in the same session, however the relay was disqualified when the second swimmer registered a negative reaction time for their start. In the morning on the fourth and final day of competition, he ranked third in the prelims heats of the 100 yard freestyle with a 42.69. Finishing in 42.38 seconds in the final, Kibler placed third behind two of his University of Texas teammates. Concluding the Championships, he helped the University of Texas 4×100 yard freestyle relay win in a Championships record time of 2:47.59, swimming a 41.80 for the second 100-yard portion of the relay.

2022 NCAA Championships

On day one of the 2022 NCAA Championships, Kibler helped break the American, US Open, and NCAA records he helped set in 2019 in the 4×200 yard freestyle relay, lowering his split time from the former records by over 1.50 seconds to a 1:30.54 to help win the event in 6:03.89. In the morning prelims heats on the second day, he qualified for the final of the 50 yard freestyle tied in rank for second with a personal best time of 18.60 seconds. Swimming a 18.87 in the final, he placed sixth overall, finishing 0.31 seconds behind first-place finisher Brooks Curry. For his second event of the evening, Kibler led-off the 4×50 yard freestyle relay in 18.83 seconds to help achieve a third-place finish in 1:14.41. The third day of competition, he ranked first in the prelims heats of the 200 yard freestyle, qualifying for the final with a time of 1:30.91. In the final, he swam a personal best time of 1:30.28 to win the NCAA title and break the pool record of 1:30.46 set by Townley Haas in 2016, finishing 0.44 seconds ahead of third-place finisher and freshman Matthew Sates. His win made him the first swimmer from Carmel to win an individual NCAA title in swimming.

Equalling his personal best time of 41.45 seconds in the preliminary heats of the 100 yard freestyle on day four, Kibler qualified for the final ranking fifth. In the final of the event, he achieved a personal best time of 41.33 seconds and placed sixth, which was 0.24 seconds off of the podium third-place finish time of 41.09 by Andrey Minakov. In his final event of the Championships, he led-off the 4×100 yard freestyle relay in 41.58 to a help achieve the NCAA title with a final time of 2:46.03.

Pro Swim Series – San Antonio
Less than a week after the 2022 NCAA Championships, Kibler started off with a 1:49.67 in the prelims heats of the 200 meter freestyle on day two of the 2022 Pro Swim Series held in San Antonio, Texas at Northside Swim Center, qualifying for the final ranking second. He won the 200 meter freestyle in the final with a time of 1:47.61. The following day, he qualified for the final of the 50 meter freestyle ranking fourth with a time of 22.49 seconds in the prelims heats. In the final, he placed fourth with a personal best time of 22.27 seconds, finishing 0.54 seconds behind first-place finisher Michael Andrew. Starting of the final day of competition, he swam a 49.46 in the prelims heats of the 100 meter freestyle to qualify for the evening final tied for third in rank with Ryan Held. In the final, he placed fourth in 49.30 seconds, 0.17 seconds behind third-place finisher Ryan Held.

2022 International Team Trials
With a personal best time of 48.28 seconds in the preliminary heats of the 100 meter freestyle on day one of the 2022 US International Team Trials in Greensboro, North Carolina in late April, Kibler qualified for the evening final ranking third. In the final, he lowered his personal best time again, dropping an additional three-hundredths of a second to finish with a 48.25 in a tie with Hunter Armstrong for fourth-place. On the second morning, he qualified for the final of the 200 meter freestyle with a time of 1:46.25 and overall rank of second in the prelims heats. In the evening final, he placed second with a personal best time of 1:45.32 and qualified for the 2022 World Aquatics Championships team in the 200 meter freestyle and 4×200 meter freestyle relay. For the prelims heats of the 100 meter butterfly on day three, he ranked ninth and qualified for the b-final in a personal best time of 52.30 seconds. He followed his prelims swim up with a time of 52.39 seconds in the final, placing seventh overall after being bumped up to the a-final. On the fifth and final day, he swam a 22.38 in the prelims heats of the 50 meter freestyle, achieving a rank of twelfth and qualifying for the evening b-final. He decided not to compete in the b-final. His fourth-place finish in the 100 meter freestyle also qualified him for the World Championships team in the 4×100 meter freestyle relay.

2022 World Aquatics Championships

Kibler started his competition at the 2022 World Aquatics Championships with his individual event, the 200 meter freestyle, swimming a 1:46.13 in the preliminaries to qualify for the semifinals ranking fifth. In the evening semifinals, he lowered his time to a 1:45.54 and qualified for the final ranking sixth. For the final, he finished just three-hundredths of a second behind Tom Dean of Great Britain with a personal best time of 1:45.01 to place fourth. In his second and final event, the 4×200 meter freestyle relay, he led-off the finals relay in 1:45.54 to help win the gold medal in a time of 7:00.24. He won his second medal of the World Championships in the 4×100 meter mixed freestyle relay, splitting a time of 48.26 seconds as part of the prelims relay and helping qualify the relay to the final ranking first before winning a bronze medal for his efforts when the finals relay, on which Brooks Curry substituted in for him, finished third in 3:21.09.

2022 Swimming World Cup
Competing at his first FINA Swimming World Cup in Toronto, Canada in October at part of the 2022 FINA Swimming World Cup, Kibler advanced to the final of the 50 meter freestyle on the first day with a personal best time of 21.62 seconds that ranked him sixth across all of the preliminary heats. He slowed it down to a 21.74 in the final, placing eighth. The following morning, he tied Kobe Ndebele of South Africa for eighteenth-place in the preliminary heats of the 100 meter freestyle with a personal best time of 48.08 seconds, not qualifying for the final. On the morning of the third and final day, he ranked third in the preliminary heats of the 200 meter freestyle with a personal best time of 1:43.78, qualifying for the final. He lowered his personal best time by two-hundredths of a second in the final, placing seventh with a 1:43.76.

At his second-ever Swimming World Cup stop, the one held in November 2022 in Indianapolis, Kibler started off with a personal best time of 3:43.68 in the preliminary heats of the 400 meter freestyle, qualifying for the final ranking fourth. He lowered his personal best time by 3.60 seconds in the final, placing fourth with a 3:40.08. The next morning, he improved upon his personal best time in the 100 meter freestyle from Toronto, swimming a 46.84 and qualifying for the final ranking second. He trimmed another two-hundredths of a second off his personal best time in the final, winning his first medal of the circuit, a bronze medal, with a time of 46.82 seconds that was 1.27 seconds behind gold medalist Kyle Chalmers of Australia and 0.55 seconds behind silver medalist Thomas Ceccon of Italy. The third morning, he lowered his personal best time in the 200 meter freestyle with a 1:43.14 in the preliminary heats and an overall second-rank, which qualified him for the final. He finished third in the final, less than two-tenths of a second behind gold medalist and fellow American Kieran Smith, winning the bronze medal with a personal best time of 1:41.93.

2022 World Short Course Championships

For the 2022 World Short Course Championships, in mid-December in Melbourne, Australia, Kibler was named to his first World Short Course Championships roster, with a spot in each the 100 meter freestyle and the 200 meter freestyle. Day one of competition, he achieved the fastest split time amongst the American prelims relay swimmers in the 4×100 meter freestyle relay with a 45.91 for the second leg, helping qualify the relay to the final ranking third. He won his first medal at a World Short Course Championships in the final, leading-off the relay with a 46.84 to help win the bronze medal in 3:05.09. The following morning, he placed seventeenth in the 100 meter freestyle with a time of 47.05 seconds.

Swimming under 21 seconds for the second leg of the 4×50 meter freestyle relay in the preliminaries on day three, Kibler helped qualify the relay to the final ranking second with a 1:24.07. Increasing his time to a 21.10 for the anchor leg of the relay in the final, he contributed to a final mark of 1:24.03 and overall fifth-place. Starting off fresh on day four, he anchored the 4×200 meter freestyle relay with a 1:41.97 in the preliminaries to help qualify the relay to the final ranking first in 6:53.63. On the finals relay, he lowered his anchor split time to a 1:41.16, helping win the gold medal in a world record-setting time of 6:44.12. In the preliminaries of the 200 metre freestyle, his second of two individual events, on day six of six, he qualified for the final ranking fourth with a personal best time of 1:41.88. In the second senior World Championships final of his career in an individual event, following the final of the 200 meter freestyle at the long course 2022 World Aquatics Championship, he placed fourth again, same as at the 2022 long course World Championships, this time with a personal best of 1:41.44, which was 1.72 seconds behind gold medalist Hwang Sun-woo of South Korea.

International championships (50 m)

 Kibler swam only in the prelims heats.

International championships (25 m)

Personal best times

Long course meters (50 m pool)

Legend: h — preliminary heat

Short course meters (25 m pool)

Legend: h – preliminary heat

Short course yards (25 yd pool)

Legend: h — preliminary heat

Swimming World Cup circuits
The following medals Kibler has won at Swimming World Cup circuits.

World records

Short course meters (25 m pool)

Continental and national records

Short course meters (25 m pool)

Short course yards (25 yd pool)

Awards and honors
 SwimSwam, Top 100 (Men's): 2022 (#98)

See also
 NCAA Division I Men's Swimming and Diving Championships
 Texas Longhorns swimming and diving
 Texas Longhorns

References

External links
 
 

2000 births
Living people
World record setters in swimming
World record holders in swimming
American male freestyle swimmers
Texas Longhorns men's swimmers
Pan American Games silver medalists for the United States
Pan American Games bronze medalists for the United States
Pan American Games medalists in swimming
Medalists at the 2019 Pan American Games
Swimmers at the 2019 Pan American Games
Swimmers at the 2020 Summer Olympics
Carmel High School (Indiana) alumni
World Aquatics Championships medalists in swimming
Medalists at the FINA World Swimming Championships (25 m)